Gohor is a commune in Galați County, Western Moldavia, Romania with a population of 3,855 people. It is composed of five villages: Gara Berheci, Gohor, Ireasca, Nărtești and Poșta.

References

Communes in Galați County
Localities in Western Moldavia